Edward Nealon (24 November 1929 – 28 January 2014) was an Irish Fine Gael politician and journalist. He was born at Aclare, County Sligo. He was first elected to Dáil Éireann as a Fine Gael Teachta Dála (TD) for Sligo–Leitrim at the 1981 general election, and was re-elected at each subsequent general election until he retired from politics at the 1997 general election. Previously he had stood for election in 1977 at Dublin Clontarf, but failed to be elected.

He served as Minister of State at the Department of Agriculture from 1981 to 1982 in the Fine Gael–Labour Party coalition government. After the November 1982 general election, another Fine Gael–Labour Party coalition government was formed in December under Taoiseach Garret FitzGerald. Nealon was appointed as Minister of State at the Department of the Taoiseach with responsibility for Arts and Culture, and in February 1983, he was appointed to the additional post of Minister of State at the Department of Posts and Telegraphs, with special responsibility for broadcasting. After the restructuring of government departments in January 1984, he was appointed Minister of State at the Department of Communications with special responsibility for radio and television.

He was the founder and editor of Nealon's Guide to the Dáil and Seanad from 1973 to 1997. This book comes out after every general election and is regarded as the 'bible' of political statistics and information. Since 1997 it has been edited by The Irish Times.

Prior to going into politics, Nealon was a well-known current affairs presenter on RTÉ. He won a Jacob's Award for his hosting of the television coverage of the 1973 Irish general election results.

He died in January 2014.

References

1929 births
2014 deaths
Fine Gael TDs
Jacob's Award winners
Irish television journalists
Members of the 22nd Dáil
Members of the 23rd Dáil
Members of the 24th Dáil
Members of the 25th Dáil
Members of the 26th Dáil
Members of the 27th Dáil
Ministers of State of the 24th Dáil
Ministers of State of the 22nd Dáil
RTÉ newsreaders and journalists